Metin Türel (13 September 1937 – 17 November 2018) was a Turkish football coach. Türel coached many teams in Turkey, he also coached the Turkey national football team from 1977 to 1978. He started his professional career with Galatasaray SK and also played for PTT, İstanbulspor, Vefa and Taksim SK as a goalkeeper.

References

1937 births
2018 deaths
Galatasaray S.K. footballers
İstanbulspor footballers
Türk Telekom G.S.K. footballers
Taksim SK footballers
Turkish football managers
Turkish expatriate football managers
Süper Lig managers
Turkey national football team managers
Saudi Arabia national football team managers
Rwanda national football team managers
Expatriate football managers in Rwanda
Expatriate football managers in Saudi Arabia
Turkish expatriate sportspeople in Rwanda
Turkish expatriate sportspeople in Saudi Arabia
Antalyaspor managers
Adana Demirspor managers
Beşiktaş J.K. managers
Gençlerbirliği S.K. managers
Samsunspor managers
Trabzonspor managers
Vefa S.K. managers
İstanbulspor managers
Association football goalkeepers
Turkish footballers
Vefa S.K. footballers
Fatih Karagümrük S.K. managers